Rami Jaffee (born March 11, 1969) is an American musician. He is best known as the keyboardist for the rock band Foo Fighters, whom he initially joined in a touring and session capacity in 2005. Jaffee has contributed to six of the band's studio albums, and in 2017 formally joined the band as a full-time member. 

Prior to joining Foo Fighters, Jaffee was a member of The Wallflowers from 1990 to 2005, and again from 2013 to 2015. He has worked with many artists including Pete Yorn, Stone Sour, Joseph Arthur and Coheed and Cambria.

Early life 
Jaffee was born on March 11, 1969, to a Russian Ashkenazi Jewish father and a Moroccan Sephardic Jewish mother in Los Angeles. When he was 13, he purchased a keyboard and was soon playing with local bands. After graduating from Fairfax High School, he continued to play in various bands, and he took session work in recording studios.

Career
Around 1989, Jakob Dylan and his friend Tobi Miller formed a group called the Apples, playing various clubs in the L.A. area. While waiting in line at Canter's Deli after 2:00 am, Jaffee heard the Apples wanted an organist and pianist, and he was told that Dylan and Miller were then in the Kibitz Room bar attached to Canter's. They met; Dylan and Miller played Jaffee some demo tapes in their car stereo, and Jaffee immediately joined the group. A few weeks later, they changed their name to the Wallflowers and signed with Virgin Records. In 1992, they released their first album, The Wallflowers. The Wallflowers toured throughout the U.S. and Canada in 1992 and early 1993. They served as the opening act for Cracker, the Spin Doctors and 10,000 Maniacs, and they started headlining their own shows.

Virgin appeared to lose interest in the Wallflowers because of poor album sales. The band's two familiar label representatives left the label, after which the record company tried to use the Dylan name as a selling point, against the band's directive. In mid-1993, the label released the band from their contract. Other labels were not interested in signing the band, and Jaffee filled his time by playing gigs with El Vez as well as taking more session work. He kept his interest in the Wallflowers, saying later, "I believe in these songs, and I'm here for the duration because no one is writing songs like these anymore, songs that have room for a Hammond organ and me."

The Wallflowers signed to Interscope Records in 1994. While working with T Bone Burnett, who was producing the band's next album, Jaffee was frequently called in as a session musician for producers Paul Fox, Matt Hyde and Rick Neigher. Because of this, in 1996 he was credited on albums by Rickie Lee Jones, the Hookers, Leah Andreone and Chalk FarM. At the same time, the Wallflowers released their second album, Bringing Down the Horse, which went quadruple Platinum. The band toured in support of the album, but in 1997, Jaffee and his wife had a daughter, and he left the tour to be with his family for two months. That same year, he performed session work with Everclear, Grant Lee Buffalo, Richie Sambora, Macy Gray, Jeremy Toback, Joe Henry, Melissa Etheridge, Ramsay Midwood and Garth Brooks.

The Wallflowers received a Grammy nomination in 1998 for "Heroes" which appeared in the film Godzilla. In late 2000, the band released Breach. The band headlined their own tour for a year but also opened for Tom Petty and the Heartbreakers, the Who and John Mellencamp. Following this, the Wallflowers released Red Letter Days, touring again during 2002–2003. With a new drummer, the band released Rebel, Sweetheart, their fifth album, on May 24, 2005. The Wallflowers toured to promote the album, but Jaffee disagreed with the band, and he abandoned the tour with three dates remaining.

In 2005, Jaffee began collaborating with Foo Fighters. He was made an official member in 2017.

Jaffee led the house band on The Fran Drescher Show and, as of 2010, co-owned a recording studio called Fonogenic Studios in the San Fernando Valley.

In 2012 and 2013, Jaffee was a member of the Sound City Players, a supergroup formed by Dave Grohl that, in addition to appearing in Grohl's 2013 documentary, Sound City, played a limited number of tour dates in 2013. The Sound City Players consisted of a rotating number of artists including Grohl, Jaffee, Stevie Nicks, Alain Johannes, Paul McCartney, Rick Springfield, Josh Homme, Trent Reznor, Krist Novoselic and more.

In 2012, Jaffee returned to the Wallflowers, who were coming off a long hiatus. They released the album Glad All Over in 2012 and toured in support of it that year and also in 2013. Jaffee then left the band again.

Discography (partial)

References

External links

1969 births
Living people
American rock keyboardists
American male organists
American people of Moroccan-Jewish descent
American people of Russian-Jewish descent
Foo Fighters members
The Wallflowers members
Mizrahi Jews
Jewish American musicians
Jewish rock musicians
Musicians from Los Angeles
The Minus 5 members
20th-century American musicians
21st-century American keyboardists
21st-century American musicians
21st-century organists
20th-century American keyboardists
American organists